Lucas Gafarot Santacatalina (born 26 September 1994), known as simply Lucas, is a Spanish footballer who plays as a left back.

Club career
Born in Sant Just Desvern, Barcelona, Catalonia, Lucas joined FC Barcelona's youth setup in 2012, after representing UE Cornellà and CF Sant Just. On 10 June of the following year, he was promoted to the reserves in Segunda División.

On 8 September 2013 Lucas made his professional debut, starting in a 2–2 away draw against CD Tenerife. On 12 August 2015 he returned to Cornellà, after agreeing to a one-year loan deal.

Club statistics

References

External links
FC Barcelona official profile

1994 births
Living people
Spanish footballers
Footballers from Catalonia
Association football defenders
Segunda División players
Segunda División B players
FC Barcelona Atlètic players
UE Cornellà players